The 1991 PBA All-Star Game is the annual All-Star Weekend of the Philippine Basketball Association (PBA). The All-Star game was held on May 26, 1991, at The ULTRA in Pasig, coinciding the league's 1991 season.

Two additional games were held from May 30 and June 2, with the two all-star teams competing with the Chinese national basketball team.

PBA Legends game

Rosters

PBA Legends A - Light:
Virgilio Abarrientos
Cris Calilan
Atoy Co
Worley Cuevas
Lucrecio Dator
Gregorio Dionisio
Francisco Henares
Rolly Marcelo
Yoyong Martirez
Manny Paner
David Regullano
Johnny Revilla
Jimmy Santos
Rodolfo Soriano
Rey Vallejo
Wilfredo Velasco
Coach: Narciso Bernardo

PBA Legends B - Dark:
Orlando Bauzon
Aurelio Clarino
Orly delos Santos
Valerio delos Santos
Felix Flores
Abet Gutierrez
Jimmy Mariano
Alfonso Mora
Lawrence Mumar
Jaime Noblezada
Cristino Reynoso
Rino Salazar
Marte Samson
Rodolfo Segura
Arturo Valenzona
Freddie Webb
Coach: Loreto Carbonell

Game

All-Star Game

Rosters

Light Team All-Stars:
Nelson Asaytono (Purefoods)
Jerry Codiñera (Purefoods)
Alejandro de Guzman (Sarsi)
Romeo dela Rosa (Shell)
Jojo Lastimosa (Alaska)
Joey Loyzaga (Sarsi)
Ronnie Magsanoc (Shell)
Benjie Paras (Shell)
Alvin Patrimonio (Purefoods)
Dindo Pumaren (Purefoods)
Alfonso Solis (Sarsi)
Elpidio Villamin (Sarsi)
Bobby Parks*
Coach: Yeng Guiao (Sarsi)

Dark Team All-Stars:
Ato Agustin (San Miguel)
Dondon Ampalayo (Ginebra)
Allan Caidic (Presto)
Rudy Distrito (Ginebra)
Gerald Esplana (Presto)
Ramon Fernandez (San Miguel)
Dante Gonzalgo (Ginebra)
Robert Jaworski (Ginebra)
Chito Loyzaga (Ginebra)
Zaldy Realubit (Presto)
Alvin Teng (San Miguel)
Manny Victorino (Pepsi)
Norman Black*
Coach: Robert Jaworski (Ginebra)

* played as import against the Chinese team.

Game

PBA-Chinese national team series

References

All-Star Game
Philippine Basketball Association All-Star Weekend